Fjotolf Hansen (born 13 February 1979), better known by his birth name Anders Behring Breivik, his initials ABB, and by his pseudonym Andrew Berwick, is a Norwegian far-right domestic terrorist. He is known primarily for committing the 2011 Norway attacks on 22 July 2011, in which he killed eight people by detonating a van bomb at Regjeringskvartalet in Oslo, and then killed 69 participants of a Workers' Youth League (AUF) summer camp, in a mass shooting on the island of Utøya.

After being found psychologically competent to stand trial, Breivik's criminal trial was held in April 2012. In July 2012 Breivik was found guilty of mass murder, causing a fatal explosion, and terrorism. Breivik was sentenced to the maximum civilian criminal penalty in Norway, which is 21 years' imprisonment in addition to preventive detention, which is the possibility of one or more extensions for as long as he is deemed a danger to society. Breivik must serve at least ten years imprisonment. Breivik announced that he did not recognize the legitimacy of the court and therefore did not accept its decision—he decided not to appeal, saying this would legitimize the authority of the Oslo District Court.

At the age of 16, he was arrested for spraying graffiti on walls. He was not chosen for conscription into the Norwegian Armed Forces. At the age of 20, he joined the anti-immigration Progress Party, and chaired the local Vest Oslo branch of the party's youth organization in 2002. He joined a gun club in 2005. He left the Progress Party in 2006. A company he founded was later declared bankrupt. He had no declared income in 2009 and his assets were 390,000 kroner (equivalent to $72,063), according to Norwegian tax authority figures. He financed the terror attacks with a total of €130,000; nine credit cards gave him access to credit.

On the day of the attacks, Breivik emailed a compendium of texts entitled 2083: A European Declaration of Independence, describing his militant ideology. In them, he stated his opposition to Islam and blamed feminism for a European "cultural suicide." The text called for the deportation of all Muslims from Europe and Breivik wrote that his main motive for the attacks was to publicize his manifesto.

Two teams of court-appointed forensic psychiatrists examined Breivik before his trial. The first team diagnosed Breivik with paranoid schizophrenia, but after this initial finding was criticized, a second evaluation concluded that he was not psychotic during the attacks but did have narcissistic personality disorder and antisocial personality disorder.

In 2016, Breivik sued the Norwegian Correctional Service, claiming that his solitary confinement violated his human rights. The justice system concluded that his rights had not been violated, despite a lower court ruling in 2016. In 2017 Breivik filed a complaint with the European Court of Human Rights, which dismissed his case in 2018.

In January 2022, due to the fact that under Norwegian law Breivik was eligible to be paroled after he had served ten years of his twenty-one year sentence, he stood trial to determine whether the District Attorney's initial decision to refuse parole would be reversed or upheld. He lost, with the court refusing his request for parole. The verdict is being appealed, and Breivik and his lawyer are working on a lawsuit regarding the conditions of his imprisonment, and violations of the European Convention on Human Rights.

Since his imprisonment, Breivik has identified himself as a fascist and a Nazi, who practices Odinism.

Family name and early life
His family name is Breivik, while Behring, his mother's maiden name, is his middle name and not part of the family name. His family name comes from Breivika in Hadsel, and means "broad vik" or "broad bay." In 2017, it was reported he had changed his legal name to Fjotolf Hansen.

Breivik was born in Oslo on 13 February 1979, the son of Wenche Behring (1946–2013), a nurse, and Jens David Breivik (born 1935), a civil economist, who worked as a diplomat for the Norwegian Embassy in London and later in Paris.

During her pregnancy, Anders Breivik's mother developed a disdain for her son. She claimed that he was a "nasty child" and that he was "kicking her on purpose". She had wanted to abort him but by the time she returned to Norway from the UK, she had passed the three-month threshold for an abortion. Psychologists reports later stated that she thought that Breivik was a "fundamentally nasty and evil child and determined to destroy her." She stopped breastfeeding her son early on because he was "sucking the life out of her." He spent the first year of his life in London until his parents divorced when he was a year old.

Reports of parental abuse
When Breivik was four, living in Oslo's Frogner district (now in Frogner borough), two reports were filed expressing concern about his mental health. A psychologist in one of the reports made a note of the boy's peculiar smile, suggesting it was not anchored in his emotions but was rather a deliberate response to his environment. In another report by psychologists from Norway's centre for child and youth psychiatry (SSBU), concerns were raised about how he was treated by his mother: "[s]he 'sexualised' the young Breivik, hit him, and frequently told him that she wished that he were dead." In the report, Wenche Behring is described as "a woman with an extremely difficult upbringing, borderline personality disorder and an all-encompassing if only partially visible depression" who "projects her primitive aggressive and sexual fantasies onto him [Breivik]". Psychiatrists recommended he be removed from his mother and placed into foster care when he was 4 years old, as she was heavily emotionally and psychologically abusive towards him. Breivik's mother fled her abusive home at age 17 and soon after that became a teenage mother. In her thirties, she was married to Jens Breivik when Anders was born.

In 1983 and 1984, at the clinic, National Centre for Child and Adolescent Psychiatry (SSBU), one psychologist and one psychiatrist wanted Breivik forcibly removed from his mother; the clinic had placed a care order for the boy but this was not carried out by the Child Welfare Service.

Breivik's mother moved back to Oslo, where she borrowed Jens Breivik's apartment in the Frogner district (now in Frogner borough). The neighbours claimed that there were noises of fights and that the mother left her children completely alone for extended periods of time, while she was working as a nurse. In 1981, Breivik's mother applied for welfare benefits, specifically monetary payment or financial aid; in 1982, she applied for respite care for her son. She says that she was overwhelmed with the boy and unable to care for him. She described him to be "clingy and demanding." Breivik was then placed, in cooperation with the Child Welfare Service, with a young couple. This couple later told police that the mother, when bringing two-year-old Breivik to the house, had asked that he be allowed to touch the man's penis because he had no one to compare himself to in terms of appearance; "He only saw [or was used to seeing girls' vaginas—] jentetisser", the mother told the couple, according to the couple's undated statement to police.

In February 1983, on the advice of her neighbours, Breivik's mother sought help from the National Centre for Child and Adolescent Psychiatry; the mother and Breivik were outpatients, and they stayed there during the daytime – for about one month. The conclusion of the stay from the psychiatrists was that Breivik should be placed in the foster care system and had to be removed from his mother for him to develop normally. The justification for this was several observations. Breivik had little emotional engagement. He did not show joy. He did not cry when he was hurt. He made no attempts to play with other children. He was also extremely clean and became anxious when his toys were not in order. Psychologists believed that he had become this way because of the negative reactions his mother displayed to any emotion he showed. They thought that she had punished him and reacted extremely negatively to him displaying emotions that had led him to become devoid of any visible emotions. His mother had also claimed that he was unclean and that she constantly had to care for him and run after him. Psychologists believed that Breivik had become this clean because of fear of punishment from his mother. He did not show the normal level of uncleanliness of a four-year-old. Breivik seemed extremely careful and controlled. He had no repertoire on how to express emotions normally. During long phases of emotional voidness, he would rarely erupt and display extreme uncontrolled emotions.

Reports of the staff said that his mother had told Breivik while she knew that she was being observed by health personnel that she "wished that he was dead". At the same time she bound him emotionally to her, alternating between great affection and extreme cruelty from one moment to the next. This was an unacceptable situation for a four-year-old to be in, according to the psychiatrists. The report from 1983 stated "Anders is a victim of his mother's projections of paranoid-aggressive and sexual fears toward men in general", and "she projects onto him her own primitive, aggressive and sexual fantasies; all the qualities in men that she regards as dangerous and aggressive." Breivik reacted very negatively to his mother. He alternated between clinginess, petty aggression and extreme childishness.
The final conclusion of the observation was that "The family is in dire need of help. Anders should be removed from the family and given a better standard of care; the mother is provoked by him and remains in an ambivalent position which prevents him from developing on his own terms. Anders has become an anxious, passive child that averts making contact. He displays a manic defense mechanism of restless activity and a feigned, deflecting smile. Considering the profoundly pathological relationship between Anders and his mother it is crucial to make an early effort to ward off a severely skewed development in the boy."
However, Child Welfare Services did not follow this recommendation. Instead, he was placed in respite care only during the weekends. SSBU hoped that eventually he would be placed into foster care.

However when Breivik's father, Jens Breivik, learned of the situation he filed for custody. Although Breivik's mother had agreed to have him put in respite care, after Jens had filed for custody she demanded that Breivik be put back into full custody with her. Both the mother and father involved lawyers. Eventually, the case was dropped because the Welfare Services thought that they would not be able to provide enough evidence in court to warrant the placement of Breivik in foster care. One of the main reasons for this was the testimony of staff from the Vigelandsparken nursery, which Breivik had been attending since 1981. They described him as a happy child and claimed that nothing was wrong or had been wrong with him all along. During all of this the SSBU maintained their stances and said "urgent action is crucially needed to prevent a severely skewed development in the boy". The SSBU wrote Child Welfare Services a letter claiming that an order should be placed to have Breivik removed by force. In 1984, a hearing in front of Barnevernsnemnda (the municipal child welfare committee) took place on whether Breivik's mother should lose custody of him. The Child Welfare Service lost the case; the agency was represented by a social worker with no experience of representing a case in front of the committee. It was ruled that the family should be supervised. However, after only three visits the supervision was discontinued. Breivik was never again put into respite care or foster care.

Later childhood and adolescence
Breivik attended Smestad Grammar School, Ris Junior High, Hartvig Nissens Upper Secondary School and Oslo Commerce School (1995–98). A former classmate recalled Breivik was an intelligent student, physically stronger than others of the same age, who often took care of people who were bullied.

Breivik lived with his mother and his elder half-sister in the West End of Oslo, regularly visiting his father and stepmother in France, until they divorced when he was 12. His mother remarried, to an officer in the Norwegian Army. Breivik chose to be confirmed into the Lutheran Church of Norway at the age of 15.

In his adolescence, Breivik's behaviour was described as rebellious. In his early teen years, he was a prolific graffiti artist and part of the hip hop community in Oslo West. He took his graffiti much more seriously than his associates did and was caught by the police on several occasions; child welfare services were notified once and he was fined on two occasions. According to Breivik's mother, after he was caught and fined for spraying graffiti on walls in 1995, at the age of 15, his father ceased contact with him. It was reported they had not been in contact since then. According to Breivik's father, however, it was his son who broke off contact, claiming "I was always willing to see [Anders]," despite his destructive activities. At this age, he also broke off contact with the hip hop community after he fell out with his best friend.

From adolescence, Breivik spent his spare time on weight training, and started to use anabolic steroids. He cared a lot about his own looks and about appearing big and strong. Breivik has criticised his parents for supporting the policies of the Norwegian Labour Party and his mother for being, in his opinion, a moderate feminist.

Adulthood
Breivik was exempt from conscription to military service in the Norwegian Army and had no military training. The Norwegian Defence Security Department, which conducts the vetting process, say he was deemed "unfit for service" at the mandatory conscript assessment.

After the age of 21, Breivik worked in the customer service department of an unnamed company, working with "people from all countries" and being "kind to everyone". A former co-worker described him as an "exceptional colleague", while a close friend of his said he usually had a big ego.

Breivik visited Belarus as a tourist in 2005. Norwegian prosecuting authorities claim that Breivik went to Belarus to meet a woman he had met on a dating website. The same woman later visited him in Oslo.

According to friends, Breivik had cosmetic surgery on his chin, nose and forehead while in his early twenties, and was pleased with the result.

2011 terror attacks

Planning

Breivik claimed he started a nine-year plan in 2002 (at the age of 23) to finance the 2011 attacks, forming his own computer programming business while working at a customer service company. He claimed his company grew to six employees and "several offshore bank accounts", and that he had made his first million kroner at the age of 24. He wrote in his manifesto that he lost 2 million kroner on stock speculation, but still had about 2 million kroner to finance the attack. The company was later declared bankrupt and Breivik was reported for several breaches of the law. He then moved back to his mother's home in order to save money. The first set of psychiatrists who evaluated him said in their report his mental health deteriorated at this stage and he entered a state of withdrawal and isolation.

In May 2009, he founded a farming company under the name "Breivik Geofarm", described as a farming sole proprietorship set up to cultivate vegetables, melons, roots, and tubers.

In 2010, he visited Prague in an attempt to buy illegal weapons. He was unable to obtain a weapon there and decided to use legal channels in Norway instead. He bought one semi-automatic 9 mm Glock 34 pistol legally by demonstrating his membership in a pistol club in the police application for a gun license, and the semi-automatic Ruger Mini-14 rifle by possessing a hunting license. Breivik's manifesto included writings detailing how he played video games such as World of Warcraft to relax, and Call of Duty: Modern Warfare 2 for "training-simulation". He told a court in April 2012 that he trained for shooting using a holographic weapon sight while playing Call of Duty. He claimed it helped him gain target acquisition.

Breivik had no declared income in 2009 and his assets amounted to 390,000 kroner ($72,063), according to Norwegian tax authority figures. He stated that in January 2010 his funds were "depleting gradually". On 23 June 2011, a month before the attacks, he paid the outstanding amount on his nine credit cards so he could have access to funds during his preparations.

According to his manifesto, Breivik used the company as a cover to legally obtain large amounts of artificial fertiliser and other chemicals for the manufacturing of explosives. A farming supplier sold Breivik's company six tonnes of fertiliser in May. The newspaper Verdens Gang reported that after Breivik bought a small quantity of an explosive primer from an online shop in Poland, his name was among 60 passed to the Police Security Service (PST) by the Norwegian Customs Service as having used the store to buy products. Speaking to the newspaper, Jon Fitje of PST said the information they found gave no indication of anything suspicious. He sets the cost of the preparations for the attacks at €317,000 – "130,000 out of pocket and 187,500 euros in lost revenue over three years."

Breivik's farmer neighbour described him as a "city dweller, who wore expensive shirts and who knew nothing about rural ways". Breivik had also covered up the windows of his house. The owner of a local bar, who once worked as a profiler of passengers' body language at Oslo Airport, said there was nothing unusual about Breivik, who was an occasional customer at the bar.

The attacks

On 22 July 2011, Breivik detonated a fertilizer bomb outside the tower block housing the office of Prime Minister Jens Stoltenberg in Oslo, resulting in eight deaths.

Within a few hours of the explosion he travelled to Utøya island, the site of a camp for Worker's Youth League, posing as a police officer in order to take the ferry to the island, and then fired intermittently for more than one hour, killing 69 with one murder victim as young as 14 years old.

Arrest
When the police tactical unit Delta (based in Oslo) arrived on the island and confronted him, he surrendered without resistance. After his arrest, he was held on the island, and interrogated throughout the night, before being moved to a holding cell in Oslo.

Breivik admitted to the crimes and said the purpose of the attack was to save Norway and Western Europe from a Muslim takeover, and that the Labour Party had to "pay the price" for "letting down Norway and the Norwegian people."

After his arrest, Breivik referred to himself as "the greatest monster since Quisling."

Booking and preparations for trial

On 25 July 2011, Breivik was charged with violating paragraph 147a of the Norwegian criminal code, "destabilising or destroying basic functions of society" and "creating serious fear in the population", both of which are acts of terrorism under Norwegian law. He was ordered held for eight weeks, the first four in solitary confinement, pending further court proceedings. The custody was extended in subsequent hearings. The indictment was ready in early March 2012. The Director of Public Prosecutions had initially decided to censor the document to the public, leaving out the names of the victims as well as details about their deaths. Due to the public's reaction, this decision was reversed prior to its release. On 30 March, the Borgarting Court of Appeal announced that it had scheduled the expected appeal case for 15 January 2013. It would be heard in the same specially-constructed courtroom where the initial criminal case was tried.

Breivik was kept at Ila Prison after arrest. There, he had at his disposal three prison cells: one where he could rest, sleep, and watch DVDs and TV, a second that was set up for him to use a computer without the Internet, and a third with gymnasium equipment. Only selected prison staff with special qualifications were allowed to work around him, and the prison management aimed to not let his presence as a high-security prisoner affect any of the other inmates. Subsequent to the January 2012 lifting of letters and visitors censorship for Breivik, he received several inquiries from private individuals, and he devoted his time to writing back to like-minded people. According to one of his attorneys, Breivik was curious to learn whether his manifesto has begun to take root in society. Breivik's attorneys, in consultation with Breivik, considered whether to have some of his interlocutors called as witnesses during the trial. Media outlets, both Norwegian and international, requested to interview Breivik. The first such was cancelled by the prison administration following a background check of the journalist in question. A second interview was agreed to by Breivik, and the prison requested a background check to be done by the police in the country of the journalist. No information was divulged about the media organisations in question.

Psychiatric evaluation
Breivik underwent his first examination by court-appointed forensic psychiatrists in 2011. The psychiatrists diagnosed him with paranoid schizophrenia, concluding that he had developed the disorder over time and was psychotic both when he carried out the attacks and during the observation. He was also diagnosed with abuse of non-dependence-producing substances antecedent of 22 July. The psychiatrists consequently found Breivik to be criminally insane.

According to the report, Breivik displayed inappropriate and blunted affect and a severe lack of empathy. He spoke incoherently in neologisms and had acted compulsively based on a universe of bizarre, grandiose and delusional thoughts. Breivik alluded to himself as the future regent of Norway, master of life and death, while calling himself "inordinately loving" and "Europe's most perfect Knight since WWII". He was convinced that he was a warrior in a "low intensity civil war" and had been chosen to save his people. Breivik described plans to carry out further "executions of categories A, B and C traitors" by the thousands, the psychiatrists included, and to organize Norwegians in reservations for the purpose of selective breeding. Breivik believed himself to be the "knight Justiciar grand master" of a Templar organisation. He was deemed to be suicidal and homicidal by the psychiatrists. According to his defence attorney, Breivik initially expressed surprise and felt insulted by the conclusions in the report. He later said "this provides new opportunities".

The outcome of Breivik's first competency evaluation was fiercely debated in Norway by mental health experts, over the court-appointed psychiatrists' opinion and the country's definition of criminal insanity. An extended panel of experts from the Norwegian Board of Forensic Medicine reviewed the submitted report and approved it "with no significant remarks". News in the meantime emerged that the psychiatric medical staff in charge of treating prisoners at Ila Detention and Security Prison did not make any observations that suggested he had either psychosis, depression or was suicidal. According to senior psychiatrist Randi Rosenqvist, who was commissioned by the prison to examine Breivik, he rather appeared to have personality disorders. Counsels representing families and victims filed requests that the court order a second opinion, while the prosecuting authority and Breivik's lawyer initially did not want new experts to be appointed. On 13 January 2012, after much public pressure, the Oslo District Court ordered a second expert panel to evaluate Breivik's mental state. He initially refused to cooperate with new psychiatrists. He later changed his mind and in late February a new period of psychiatric observation, this time using different methods than the first period, was begun.

If the original diagnosis had been upheld by the court, it would have meant that Breivik could not be sentenced to a prison term. The prosecution could instead have requested that he be detained in a psychiatric hospital. Medical advice would then have determined whether or not the courts decided to release him at some later point. If considered a perpetual danger to society, Breivik could have been kept in confinement for life. Shortly after the second period of pre-trial psychiatric observation was begun, the prosecution said it expected Breivik would be declared legally insane. On 10 April 2012, the second psychiatric evaluation was published with the conclusion that Breivik was not psychotic during the attacks and he was not psychotic during their evaluation. Instead, they diagnosed antisocial personality disorder and narcissistic personality disorder. Breivik expressed hope at being declared sane in a letter sent to several Norwegian newspapers shortly before his trial, in which he wrote about the prospect of being sent to a psychiatric ward: "I must admit this is the worst thing that could have happened to me as it is the ultimate humiliation. To send a political activist to a mental hospital is more sadistic and evil than to kill him! It is a fate worse than death."

On 8 June 2012, Professor of Psychiatry Ulrik Fredrik Malt testified in court as an expert witness, saying he found it unlikely that Breivik had schizophrenia. According to Malt, Breivik primarily had Asperger syndrome, Tourette syndrome, narcissistic personality disorder and possibly paranoid psychosis. Malt cited a number of factors in support of his diagnoses, including deviant behaviour as a child, extreme specialization in Breivik's study of weapons and bomb technology, strange facial expression, a remarkable way of talking, and an obsession with numbers. Eirik Johannesen disagreed, concluding that Breivik was lying and was not delusional or psychotic. Johannesen had observed and spoken to Breivik for more than 20 hours.

Pre-trial hearing 
In the pre-trial hearing, February 2012, Breivik read a prepared statement demanding to be released and treated as a hero for his "pre-emptive attack against traitors" accused of planning cultural genocide. He said, "They are committing, or planning to commit, cultural destruction, including deconstruction of the Norwegian ethnic group and deconstruction of Norwegian culture. This is the same as ethnic cleansing."

Criminal trial and conviction

The criminal trial of Breivik began on 16 April 2012 in Oslo Courthouse under the jurisdiction of Oslo District Court. The appointed prosecutors were Inga Bejer Engh and Svein Holden with Geir Lippestad serving as Breivik's lead counsel for the defence. Closing arguments were held on 22 June.

On 24 August 2012, Breivik was adjudged sane (at the time the crimes were committed) and sentenced to preventive detention for a period of 21 years — the maximum penalty in Norway; with a minimum non-parole period of 10 years(the longest minimum sentence available). This sentence allows the court to continue Breivik's detention indefinitely, five years at a time for as long as the prosecuting authority deems it neccesary in order to protect society. Whilst Breivik pleaded not guilty, Breivik did not appeal the sentence, and on 8 September, the media announced that the verdict was final.

The court said, "many people share Breivik's conspiracy theory, including the Eurabia theory. The court finds that very few people, however, share Breivik's idea that the alleged 'Islamisation' should be fought with terror."

Trial in 2022
On 18 January 2022, a trial started at Telemark District Court – in a makeshift courtroom in Skien Prison – to decide whether to reverse or uphold the District Attorney's refusal of parole. The indictment states that the prosecuting authority does not consent to parole because "forvaring [a type of continued detention] is deemed necessary to protect society".

As of August 2021, Breivik had been indicted again; in 2022 Verdens Gang said about prisoners that are in preventive detention and who the Norwegian Prosecuting Authority has rejected parole for: those prisoners must be indicted again and the indictment must undergo a trial.

At the start of the trial, Breivik gave several Nazi salutes, to both the judge and the members of the public in the courtroom. In his initial testimony, Breivik stated that he continues to be a Nazi and will continue to work for White Power, but no longer wants to pursue it through violence. He says that he is trying to register a Nazi political party; he apparently is aspiring to be a candidate running for parliamentary election in Norway.

Breivik's lawyer, said that he wants Breivik to serve his prison sentence together with one or more inmates; furthermore if that were to happen, then it would have to be with Philip Manshaus – because they would not injure each other.

On day two, a Swedish local politician belonging to the Nordic Resistance Movement, testified. The next witness, Randi Rosenqvist, was a psychiatrist who retired in 2020; She said that she had met with Breivik as late as May and June 2017. Regarding possible activities to break up the monotony of Breivik's imprisonment or to decrease the predictable environment, she suggested: Could the prison not take him on a daytrip to the forest in Skien – in a part of the forest where people seldom go? Could he sit in the backseat of a car, while correction officers purchased ice cream for him? On the other hand the prison can not do much when he is imprisoned under conditions of particularly high security, she said. The court permitted that Breivik could interject a comment regarding the testimonies from Rosenqvist and Öberg; Breivik said that Rosenqvist is not an expert on extremism. Breivik added that Rosenqvist said that he uses "a lot of time" on politics, however Breivik commented that he uses nearly all his time on business plans and his studies.

The next witness was Emily Krokann – an advisor at the prison, who has a law degree. She testified about a document that she did not write – about the prison's view that Breivik should not be paroled. Furthermore, she said that "Repeatedly letters have been stopped, that were to persons he had no contact with before the acts of terrorism". Furthermore she said that "Letters to public figures have been stopped, because supporters might become inspired by the letters". Furthermore she said that Breivik used anti-depressants – medicines against depression; furthermore she was asked by Breivik's lawyer, if she could give an example of one person who Breivik had two-way communication with, through postal letters; she said "No". Furthermore, she said that there is a goal that we, the Correctional Service will consider transferring Breivik to another prison with different conditions for serving the sentence; however, what this really means is not clear, NRK said.

The next witness was Espen Jambak, assistant warden. He said that Breivik has permission to write letters to people he knew "before" [the acts of terrorism]. Furthermore he said that he agrees with that there is little "progresjon". Progresjon entails that the prisoner is given the possibility of gradually transferring to lower security conditions, up to and including serving the sentence as a parolee.  Rehabilitation can be aided by giving room for progresjon.

On day three, Storrvik said that "It is a paradox that if a [prisoner] is treated so badly [by the government while] in prison that he never gets better, then he will never be released". Furthermore he said that someone can do horrible things, without later, as an ex-con or parolee, trying to repeat it. There are a number of arguments that speak against any repeat from Breivik: the crimes were solved, and what happened – has been confronted, said Storrvik; furthermore, the crimes became so grave because the planning was done out of sight; furthermore, today Breivik is known – that speaks for that a scheme with tight controls could prevent acts that can lead to an imagined parole turning into re-arrest and detention, said Storrvik. Furthermore he said that "In regard to ... evaluation of the danger for new acts [of terrorism,] I think that what [Breivik wrote in a letter] to Putin and NATO is [hardly relevant and] not a good example. Especially not when he writes that he would like negotiations with non-violent remedies". There is a goal that all punishment in Norway should have progresjon, Storrvik said during closing arguments, according to Anders Giæver. Breivik has not had physical contact with anyone except correction officers, for the last nine years, his lawyer said, adding "That might be against regulations".

NRK's crime journalist, Olav Rønneberg, said that: "In other words, the opinion of Breivik's lawyer is that if there is no facilitation for improvements, then the regulations will be violated by the government to a degree where the courts will be forced to let him out sometime in the future".

The trial ended on 20 January. The verdict was handed down on 1 February. The verdict says that Breivik appears to be "obviously mentally disturbed, and with a mind that is difficult for other people to penetrate".

As of 2022, another court appearance will not occur for at least two years.

Reactions
Some psychiatrists watched media's broadcasts from the trial and they claim that Breivik appears to be mentally ill. Tor Ketil Larsen (professor of Psychiatry, UiB), says that Breivik appears psychotic, and that treatment should be attempted with counseling and possibly antipsychotics, by a psychiatrist that has a hypothesis that Breivik has become psychotic. Fred Heggen (psychiatrist and chief physician at Gaustad Hospital) says that Breivik appears to have clearly  psychotic behavior and way of thinking - and Breivik "has a lack of reality that is pervasive, and it is dramatic". Neither have spoken with Breivik.

Pål Grøndahl, Ph.D a psychologist specialist, says a slippery hypothesis is, that Breivik's personality is so fragmented, that he moves, psychologically speaking, at the edge of the states between psychotic disorders and personality disorders; the hypothesis tries to answer the question of why it is difficult to attribute a clinical diagnosis to Breivik. Grøndahl goes on to say that "[when Breivik] throws forward odd ideas like that he was brainwashed in 2011, radicalised by descendents of German SS soldiers, and ordered by a right-wing 'collective' to re-establish the Third Reich, he sounds like a person that has a lacking sense of reality"; furthermore, it is not difficult to notice statements from Breivik that are characteristic of psychosis.

Randi Rosenqvis, one of Norway's leading forensic psychiatrists who has actually had conversations with Breivik disagrees with the comments that Breivik is psychotic; who appeared as the Norwegian Correctional Service's own psychiatrist, said that although she thought Breivik's thoughts were "crazy" they were "completely down to earth", and that she believed he had autism. Rosenqvis stated in Aftenposten, she found he mostly functioned in a clearly non-psychotic manner.

Tor Langback, a lawyer, said that Breivik seems more insane now than during the criminal trial in 2012; furthermore, Breivik's prison conditions are not exactly aiding the improvement of his mental health.

Alf Petter Høgberg, a law professor at UiO), watched and listened to media's broadcasts of the trial; he described Breivik's behavior as disturbing (and Høgberg was already aware that some psychiatrists were calling Breivik's 2022 appearance in court psychotic).

In 2021, Aage Storm Borchgrevink, Norwegian author and literary critic, said that "Even after 77 burials ... the Norwegian press does not want to tell about the child abuse and psychiatric illness in Breivik's family".

Prison life

Since August 2011, Breivik has been imprisoned in an SHS section (a prison section with "particularly high security"—"særlig høy sikkerhet"); In March 2022, Breivik was transferred to Ringerike Prison; the conditions under which he serves will remain the same as earlier.

Previously, between the inception of SHS, in 2002, and 2016 Norway had only imprisoned ten or eleven prisoners under these conditions, of which Breivik's term has been the longest.

On 23 July 2012 he transferred from Ila Detention and Security Prison in Bærum to Skien Prison, formally known as Telemark fengsel, Skien avdeling, in Skien, county Vestfold og Telemark. on 28 September 2012 he transferred back to "Ila"; from September 2013 until 2022 he was in Skien.

Since 2015 or March 2014, Breivik has received visits from a prison visitor—a military chaplain (ranked major)—every two weeks; this visitor has been paid 164,000 Norwegian kroner, by the government , in regard to [visiting] Breivik. His mother visited him five times before her death in 2013 and researcher Mattias Gardell interviewed Breivik in 2014, but no other visitors requested by Breivik have been granted access.

He is isolated from the other inmates, and only has contact with health care workers and guards. The type of isolation that Breivik has experienced in prison is what the European Court of Human Rights (ECtHR) calls relative social isolation, according to a verdict of 2016 in Oslo District Court. In November 2020, Breivik had fellowship with another prisoner [for the first time], in the presence of [at least] seven prison officers; the prisoners played cards and talked for around one or two hours; the other prisoner chose to not have a third meeting with Breivik, according to media reports in January 2021.

In Europe, it is not uncommon to grant compensatory measures to prisoners that are being held in isolation for several years. , he has an electric typewriter and an Xbox (without internet connection) in his cell. Previously, when the original verdict was upheld in September 2012, his permission for access to a computer (without internet) in his prison cell ended.

Breivik has been enrolled since 2015 in the bachelor's degree program in political science at the University of Oslo; he passed two courses that year; however court testimony in 2022 claimed that two courses were passed at Høyskolen på Molde and BI [a business school] – and he [studied or] started with political science and did everything he can do without attending [the educational institution] physically, therefore he has not taken [the exam at the end of the term, or] the exam; [thru, or] at HiMolde he studied Economics. He is scheduled to take exams in early 2022. Nobody at the high-security section "has internet", court testimony said in 2022. In 2015, he claimed in a letter that harsh prison conditions had forced him to drop out of the course. According to a March 2016 statement by his lawyer, Breivik had become a Nazi in prison.

The government denied him parole in 2021, and the court system upheld that decision in 2022. Previously, in September 2020, an application for Breivik's parole was made by his attorney, Øystein Storrvik. As of July 2021, Breivik has been in prison for ten years, granting him the right to have the court system review his petition for parole.

Political activity and attempts at correspondence
In 2012, Breivik planned to set up an organisation he called the Conservative Revolutionary Movement which he envisioned consisting of around 50 right-wing activists in Europe, as well as an organization for imprisoned right-wing activists; Breivik has written to, among others, Peter Mangs and Beate Zschäpe. In 2012, he spent 8–10 hours per day writing. He has said that he wants to write three books: the first being his own account of the events on the day of the attacks, the second discussing the ideology underlying his actions, and a third on his visions for the future. Politicians have protested Breivik's activities in prison, which they see as him continuing to expose his ideology and possibly encouraging further criminal acts.

Since 2013, Breivik has been held at Skien Prison. As with all convicts his letters are vetted before sending to prevent further crimes. After he came to Skien Prison, 5 out of 300 letters that he had sent had not been confiscated, he testified in court in 2016. He added: "Of the 200 forms regarding prison visits that I have mailed, all have been confiscated." By 2016, around 4,000 postal items had been sent to or from Breivik, and about 15 percent of these (600 items) had been confiscated. On 11 March 2016, political scientist Ingeborg Kjos was copied in on a letter from Breivik to the Ministry of Justice that had taken over a year and a half to reach her; the letter did not advocate violence.

In a reply to a December 2019 letter from Breivik addressed to all members of parliament and with a personalized note to Kamzy Gunaratnam, a survivor of the Utøya attack, Gunaratnam wrote: "... As deputy mayor [... of Oslo] it is my job to see that no one experiences the same social rejection that you did [experience]. Your fight against social rejection is the only fight we have in common, Anders. The fight against the lacking presence of parents and adults. [Lack of] teachers who saw you [or validated you]. [Lack of] psychiatric assistance."

In 2021, NRK printed a facsimile of part of a letter which Breivik sent in July 2021 to an organisation headed by the mother of a female that Breivik had killed. The letter is described as "white power propaganda".

Complaints about prison conditions
In November 2012, Breivik wrote a 27-page letter of complaints to the prison authorities, talking about the security restrictions he was being held under, claiming that the prison director personally wanted to punish him. Among his complaints were that his cell was not adequately heated and that he had to wear three layers of clothing in order to stay warm, guards interfered with his strictly-planned daily schedule, his cell was poorly decorated and had no view, his reading lamp was inadequate, guards supervised him while he would brush his teeth and shaved, and put indirect mental pressure on him to finish quickly by tapping their feet while waiting, he was "not having candy" and was served cold coffee, and he was strip-searched daily, sometimes by female guards. Authorities only lifted one minor restriction against Breivik; his rubber safety pen, which he described as an "almost indescribable manifestation of sadism," was replaced with an ordinary pen.

In letters to foreign media outlets, he told them about his demands (in 2013) to prison authorities "including easier communication with the outside world and a PlayStation 3 to replace the current PlayStation 2, because it offered more suitable games"; media reported in 2014 about demands that he would starve himself to death if he was refused "access to a sofa and a bigger gym"; furthermore he said that "Other inmates have access to adult games while I only have the right to play less interesting kids' games. One example is "Rayman Revolution", a game aimed at three year-olds," Breivik complained to prison officials."

In September 2015, Breivik again threatened a hunger strike, because of deteriorating prison conditions, but delayed in order to sue the Norwegian Government over prison conditions.

Civil trial against Norwegian government 
During 15–18 March 2016, Breivik was the plaintiff in a civil trial against the government of Norway. The verdict in the lower court was appealed; in the appellate court, he lost on all counts, and the supreme court decided not to hear the case.

Breivik sued the government over his solitary confinement, and his general conditions of imprisonment, including a claim of an excessive use of handcuffs. Breivik claimed that his solitary confinement violated his human rights and asserted that he had been subjected to "degrading treatment, including hundreds of strip searches and frequent searches of his cell, including at night."

The Parliamentary Ombudsman had previously reported that the regimen for serving a prison sentence at the level of particularly high security constitutes a heightened risk of inhumane treatment.

On 14 March, members of the court performed a walk-through of prison cells used by Breivik at Ila Prison; later the same week the members of the court inspected the prison facilities used by Breivik at Skien Prison. No members of the press were permitted to join the walk-through, as per decisions by Oslo District Court.
 
On 15 March, Oslo District Court convened inside Skien Prison. 
After his handcuffs were removed upon his arrival, Breivik faced the gallery and performed a Nazi salute. One judge said that Breivik's salute seemed disruptive, "therefore I wish that you do not do it again". A lawyer from the Office of the Attorney General said that of Breivik's incoming and outgoing mail, through the postal system, around 15 percent (or 600 pieces of mail out of around 4,000) had been confiscated. Øystein Storrvik, the head of Breivik's legal team, told the court about Breivik's letter of complaint to the government in 2012 which detailed being awakened by flashlight as often as every half-hour.

Parts of the trial proceedings were to be closed to the general public; Oslo District Court ruled twice on the matter, according to news reports.

Breivik's testimony
On 16 March, Breivik started his testimony, "to give his view on the strict prison regimen [that he is exposed to] and any damage done to his health while in prison as a cause of isolation". He reported having been handcuffed 3,500 times.

The main points of his testimony were:
He had been subjected to a "grip manoeuvre" 2,300 times—where he put his hands through the slot of the door to his prison cell, and his hands had been held in place by a prison officer while the door swung open. Breivik described these two forms of "extra punishment", saying: "it is quite demeaning to be exposed to this every day, so I countered by not leaving my prison cell. I did not want to exercise in the fresh air, [I did not want to] train, or use my study [prison-] cell."
On paper he had three prison cells, but because of the government's actions he hardly used the training cell and the study cell.
Prison officers at Ila Prison were not to speak to him during his [first] stay there, and this was the case for parts of his stay at Skien [prison]; only the chief of the section was supposed to speak to Breivik. Furthermore, Breivik had not said "no" to the prison offering him activities such as playing floorball or chess, but asked to be offered other activities. Beginning in March 2014, he said he was finally able to  receive the one hour of fellowship with prison officers; he said that claims had been made that he was allowed to prepare food, but that he was permitted only to press an egg cooker, and was not permitted to put frozen pizza in the oven—that he had only done once.
He still received a prison visitor twice a month—an officer of the Norwegian Armed Forces.
Regarding recreation in fresh air, Breivik said: "Until December 2015 all outdoor recreation was in a concrete box. In December 2015, probably because of the upcoming trial, I was permitted to walk 20 minutes in the outdoors recreation area. A couple of weeks later I was permitted [again]. Thereafter I was permitted to recreate there every other week."
Regarding being awoken at night, Breivik said: "There are inspections through the slot [of the door to the prison cell] every 40 minutes. Every time the slot was opened they demanded a sign of life. They wanted me to shake a leg every time the slot opened". He felt humiliated that the prison officers made such a demand and said "They shined a flashlight into the bed, depending on the prison officer. Called into the cell Are you alive, are you alive, until I woke up. Then they had the sign of life that they needed. Countless times I was awoken at night."
After he came to Skien Prison, only 5 out of 300 letters that Breivik sent, had not been confiscated: "Of the 200 forms regarding prison visits that I have mailed, all have been confiscated."
In 2015, he was told that he would be locked into an isolation cell for 23 hours a day; the decision was reversed in December 2015, weeks after the visit by the Parliamentary Ombudsman.
Breivik said: "Dark film on all the windows has prevented natural light, and it is not possible to see anything outside during large parts of the winter months of the year."
Breivik testified about how the authorities prevent him from buying postage stamps, and how Skien Prison has confiscated envelopes [where the stamps are] worth several thousand Norwegian kroner.
Breivik told about having to wait a long time after having asked for [the prison officers to present his] toothbrush, or asked [the prison officers] about turning off the TV switch; "This low-level terrorising continued for two years until" his transfer to Skien [prison].
Breivik testified that he had to drink cold coffee because he was not permitted to have a thermos; Breivik has also complained about announcements over the PA system at Ila, including that each message was repeated such as Now it's time for outdoors recreation, it's time for outdoors recreation; the PA system was eventually switched off in Breivik's section [at the prison].
Breivik says that he had not been permitted to publish his correct mailing address.
Breivik said: "It is important that Oslo District Court says what types of addressees [pertaining to the postal system] are permissible." He added that media [outlets] that he has access to are Aftenposten, Dagen, TA and Varden, and broadcast Teletext on several channels; he would read other newspapers if he had such access, "Klassekampen is perhaps even more interesting than Aftenposten."
Breivik testified that after two years in isolation he has started to love  the reality television program Paradise Hotel, which he says is evidence that he has become seriously brain damaged.
Breivik said that "Isolation is the most effective way to radicalise people because one never gets corrected by others."
Breivik talked about the parties NFP and NL; he said that those later changed name to ["Nordic State" or] Nordiske stat.

Cross-examination of witnesses
The first witness, Randi Rosenqvist, a psychiatrist at Ila Prison, was cross-examined by Storrvik. Storrvik asked if she had suggested visits without a glass wall; Rosenqvist replied: "Yes I have discussed this. I have been thinking that visits without a glass wall could be something [to consider]. I don't think that with his image, he would be violent to someone he has [some sort of] a [working-] relationship to." Storrvik read out loud, recommendations by Rosenqvist, including "Retired police officers could, for example, come [to socialise with Breivik], drink coffee, play games".

On the third day of the trial, Storrvik introduced a report from the "prevention section" at [the office of] the Parliamentary Ombudsman, dated 11 November 2015, regarding a series of visits that year by the ombudsman; the report said that Breivik was being held at a section where sometimes there was only one prisoner. Storrvik read from the report that "The limitations on visits at the time of the inspection [by the Parliamentary Ombudsman] seemed quite strict". He said that in that section of the prison, it should expand the planned [fellowship or] community between prisoners and employees and consider other measures to minimise the risk of isolation damage. At that section the prison should evaluate alternative possibilities for recreation in fresh air, in addition to the concrete exercise yard. The report recommended that the prison should discontinue the visual surveillance of health-related conversations that occur with a glass wall between prisoner and health personnel. (Despite The Parliamentary Ombudsman being called as a witness, no one from the office was forced to testify in court, and no one from that office testified.)

The second witness was Knut Bjarkeid, Chief Warden at Ila Prison. Storrvik confronted Bjarkeid with a document regarding [prison] Section G being turned [in part] into a "particularly high security department". He read: "There are obvious limits to how long he can be in Section G"; the document was written by Bjarkeid. Storrvik said: "The words are here, obviously there are limits to how long he shall be isolated. This was in 2012. He is still in total isolation". After Bjarkeid left the witness stand, the government's chief lawyer in the trial, Marius Emberland read out loud from a letter that Breivik had written, dated 29 September 2013; in the letter Breivik reported several persons to the police; the Asker and Bærum Police District investigated and later dropped the investigation; Breivik's letter detailed the number of strip searches, "grip manoeuvres", and handcuffings he had undergone.

The third witness was Bjørn Draugedalen, a general practitioner working one day per week at Skien Prison. His first consultation with Breivik was held in a recreation room in a high-security unit. Draugedalen shook hands with Breivik, with five prison officers present; all the later consultations (until the trial) were held with a glass wall separating them. Storrvik asked: "This change, when another prisoner arrived [and started to live in the same prison section], which resulted in Breivik's movement being restricted—did you consider to go up there to view [his living conditions or] how things were"?; Draugedalen answered: "We have to deal with changes done by the Corrections Services". The judge interjected, and she said that the Correction Services likely would listen to health care workers; Draugedalen replied that "We did not see any extra value then, regarding visiting him in the [prison] section". Draugedalen said that he has not been notified that Breivik has discontinued his [college/university] studies.

The fourth witness was Haukeland, an MD for prisoners at Ila Prison. At 13:46 Storrvik read from [Breivik's medical] record dated 5 February 2013 that Breivik intends to recreate less in fresh air because of the strip searches that follow; Storrvik asked Haukeland: "The fact that he goes outside less, to avoid being strip searched, was that discussed as a problem?; Haukeland answered: "No, that was not discussed [among the health care workers or] in the health section". At 13:51 the judge referred to nightly inspections every half hour, and Haukeland answers that he cannot remember; the judge asked: "Were you the ones who recommended that"?; Haukeland replied: "No (...)".

The next two witnesses were Margit Kise and Tore Stenshagen, section leaders at Skien Prison. Stenshagen testified that sometimes he sits down [in Breivik's cell] and talks with Breivik, and sometimes they are accompanied by only one prison officer.

The seventh (and last) witness was Jørgen Spangen Iversen, an advisor at the Correctional Agency. Iversen was asked why Breivik was transferred to Skien rather than to Ringerike Prison; Iversen answered that he became a case-worker in 2014, and he was not involved in the transfer.

Closing arguments
Summing up the case for Breivik, Storrvik said: "For some reason, in Norway it has been established that in a female prison, a male prison officer cannot strip search a prisoner, but in a male prison it is ok that females are present. This is offensive—I do not see any alternatives". He then talked about the case of strip searches of prisoner Piechowicz in Poland. In that case, the court was not convinced by the Polish government's arguments that the systematic, humiliating, daily searches were necessary to secure the prison. He continued: "He was also awoken at night, but he had 147 visits that compensated", and Piechowicz's isolation lasted for a shorter period; Storrvik said: "Note that one calls it isolation, even though he had one cellmate". Storrvik said that "the verdict [of] Piechowicz vs. Poland point to a breach of ECHR in our case".

Storrvik said: "In my opinion there is not a complete concurrence between risk analyses and measures in our case. Risk analyses have at an early stage come with suggestions for measures [and these have not been followed up] (...) For example, removing the glass wall during visits and the possibility of introducing fellow prisoner, has been discussed at such an early stage that there should be a good reason for why Rosenqvist's advice has not been followed". Storrvik said: "The main problem for the government in this case is that the discrepancies between well-founded—in the context of security—suggestions from one of those who knows this case the best has not been followed".

Storrvik compared Breivik's position as a Catch-22 situation: if Breivik says that he has psychiatric problems, then he has picked them out of a book; if he says that he does not have psychiatric problems, then he does not have psychiatric problems.

Storrvik said that there had been no inspections by agencies tasked with oversight, as far as he knew, until the Parliamentary Ombudsman came. Breivik's lawyer referred to anal inspections [—visual or manual body cavity searches]; he disagreed with Emberland's view that there was a difference regarding anal inspection as referred to in ECHR verdicts in other cases, and the squats that Breivik must perform while naked; Storrvik's opinion is that Ila lacks concrete reasons for all the inspections.

Mestad said: "The government's primary task is to protect its citizens. To let a convicted terrorist establish a network, is dangerous".

Storrvik said Breivik's [previous] verdict "indicates a mental vulnerability. If that is not enough, Breivik appears—by my standards—confused in court". Storrvik added that [in Storrvik's usage,] "mental vulnerability is a very, very weak expression".

Emberland said that "Storrvik is quoting from the dissenting opinions from verdicts of the ECHR"—at least as much as he is quoting the majority opinions of the verdicts.

On 18 March 2016 after the court was adjourned, the room where the trial had been held was turned back into the prison gymnasium.

Reactions (out of court) to Breivik's testimony
Breivik's testimony about his ideology was described as incoherent.

In Dagbladet, Aina Sundt Gullhaugen (research advisor and psychologist) said about prison superintendent Bjarkeid's opinion that Breivik is not one of the prisoners at Ila suffering [from isolation]: 

In Aftenposten, Ulrik Fredrik Malt [expert witness at the 2012 trial] said that "the mass murderer is mentally quite ill, and that's being undercommunicated".

Verdict in lower court 
On 20 April 2016, District Court Judge Helen Andenæs Sekulic gave her verdict. The verdict said that the conditions of his imprisonment breached Article 3 of the European Convention on Human Rights, but that Article 8 of the Convention had not been violated—confiscation of letters had been justified. The government was also ordered to pay Norwegian kroner 330,937.5 ($40,373) for the plaintiff's legal expenses incurred by the court case. (Breivik could not receive the money, but his lawyer could upon the verdict being upheld.) Breivik was not in any courtroom when he received the verdict; media said that his copy would be faxed [to the prison].

Reactions to verdict
On 21 April 2016, news media said that Ole Kristoffer Borhaug, chief warden at Skien Prison, said that the prison regimen for Breivik would not be lightened, in part because the verdict has not been officially upheld, and there are regulations preventing high security prisoners from interacting with prisoners of other categories.

Other reactions to the verdict include those of former convicts: Kjell Alrich Schumann said that the verdict is most importantly about the principles regarding the application of isolation in Norwegian prisons. He said: "The decisions are evaluated by an entity at the Correctional Service every six months, and they can use any kinds of arguments. There is no oversight"; Sven-Eirik Utsi said that "isolation [is something that the prison system of] Norway has been criticised about for several decades [by the ECtHR]".

The government's chief lawyer in the trial, Marius Emberland, had voiced his opinion about the verdict before the appeal; his opinion was criticized by the leader of the Norwegian Judges' Association, Ingjerd Thune: "I clearly understand that many react. I have never heard a lawyer speak in that manner—ever. That was surprising"; lawyer Frode Sulland said that one gets the impression that Office of the Attorney General "does not respect the justice system, and they still think that they are right, even when the court thinks they are wrong"; Emberland eventually recognised that some of his verbal comments can be interpreted as arrogant, adding that "they really were not meant that way".

Legal scholar Mads Andenæs, said that "The appeal has no bearing on the responsibility of the government to evaluate and make the changes that the verdict of Oslo District Court imposes on the government. This results directly from Norwegian Law and practices of ECtHR".

Loss on appeal
On 5 August, media said that Storrvik claims that the judge [scheduled to rule in the trial] is partial; the judge was recused.

The appeal was heard in Borgarting Court of Appeal (convening within the prison), starting 10 January 2017; Breivik came to court without handcuffs.

Storrvik made comparisons with verdicts at European Court of Human Rights, including the case of the leader of Kurdistan Workers' Party (PKK) (Abdullah Öcalan); that court found that Öcalan's human rights had been violated from the 6th year of his imprisonment —until the 10th year [... when his isolation ended, and fellowship with other prisoners was permitted].

The verdict, handed down on 1 March 2017, stated that solitary confinement did not violate Breivik's rights, and all recommendations were voided.

In June 2017, Norway's Supreme Court decided not to hear the case.

Financing of legal aid and family situation
, Breivik is still receiving pro bono legal aid from the law firm of Øystein Storrvik – his lawyer since 2014. Previously the firm of Geir Lippestad did pro bono representation of Breivik (after the 2012 trial). Legal aid during criminal trials has been paid by the government, as is the norm in the country.

On 23 March 2013, Breivik's mother died from complications from cancer. On the same day media said that mother and son "took farewell during a meeting at Ila last week. Breivik was permitted to move himself out from behind the glass wall of the visit room—to give his mother a farewell hug". Breivik asked prison officials for permission to attend his mother's funeral service; permission was denied.

Writings and video

Forums and YouTube
Janne Kristiansen, then Chief of the Norwegian Police Security Service (PST), said Breivik "deliberately desisted from violent exhortations on the net [and] has more or less been a moderate, and has neither been part of any extremist network." He is reported to have written many posts on the Islam-critical website document.no. He also attended a meeting of "Documents venner" (Friends of Document), affiliated with the website, in late 2009. Due to the media attention on his Internet activity following the 2011 attacks, document.no compiled a complete list of comments made by Breivik on its website between September 2009 and June 2010.

A Dagens Næringsliv article said that Breivik sought to start a Norwegian version of the Tea Party movement in cooperation with the owners of document.no, but that they, after expressing initial interest, turned down his proposal because he did not have the contacts he promised.

Six hours before the attacks, Breivik posted a picture of himself as a Knight Templar officer in a uniform festooned with a gold aiguillette and multiple medals he had not been awarded. In the video, he included an animation depicting Islam as a Trojan horse in Europe. The video, which promotes fighting against Islam, shows Breivik wearing a wetsuit and holding a semi-automatic weapon.

Manifesto: 2083: A European Declaration of Independence

Content
Breivik prepared a document titled 2083: A European Declaration of Independence. It runs to 1,518 pages and is credited to "Andrew Berwick" (an Anglicization of Breivik's name). Breivik admitted in court that it was mostly other people's writings he had copied and pasted from different websites.
The file was e-mailed to 1,003 addresses about 90 minutes before the bomb blast in Oslo. It reported Breivik spent thousands of hours gathering email addresses from Facebook for distribution of the document, and that he rented a farm as a cover for a fake farming company buying fertilizer (3 tons for producing explosives and 3 tons of a harmless kind to avoid suspicion) and as a lab. It describes burying a crate with the armour in the woods in July 2010, collecting it on 4 July 2011, and abandoning his plan to replace it with survival gear because he did not have a second pistol. It also expresses support for far-right groups such as the English Defence League and paramilitaries such as the Scorpions in Serbia.

The introductory chapter of the manifesto asserts that political correctness is responsible for social rot. He blames the Frankfurt School for the promulgation of political correctness, which he identifies with "cultural Marxism". Parts of these sections are plagiarized from Political Correctness: A Short History of an Ideology by Paul Weyrich's Free Congress Foundation. Major parts of the compendium are attributed to the pseudonymous Norwegian blogger Fjordman, while Serbian writer, Srđa Trifković, is quoted in a number of places.

The text also copies sections of the Unabomber manifesto, without giving credit, while replacing the words "leftists" with "cultural Marxists" and "black people" with "muslims". The New York Times described American influences in the writings, observing that the compendium mentions the anti-Islamist American Robert Spencer 64 times and cites Spencer's works at great length. The work of Bat Ye'or is frequently cited. Conservative blogger Pamela Geller is also mentioned as a source of inspiration. Breivik blames feminism for allowing the erosion of the fabric of European society and advocates a restoration of patriarchy which he claims would save European culture.

India, and in particular Hindu nationalism, figures repeatedly in the manifesto where he expresses praise and admiration for Hindu nationalist groups. He claimed to have attempted to reach out to Indians through email & Facebook. In his writings Breivik also states that he wants to see European policies on multiculturalism and immigration more similar to those of Japan, South Korea and Taiwan which he said are "not far from cultural conservatism and nationalism at its best". He expressed his admiration for the "monoculturalism" of Japan and for Japan and South Korea's refusal to accept refugees. The Jerusalem Post describes his support for Israel as a "far-right Zionism". He calls all "nationalists" to join in the struggle against "cultural Marxists/multiculturalists".

He also expressed his admiration of the Russian Prime Minister Vladimir Putin, finding him "a fair and resolute leader worthy of respect", though he was "unsure at this point whether he has the potential to be our best friend or our worst enemy." Putin's spokesman Dmitry Peskov has denounced Breivik's actions as the "delirium of a madman".

Analysis
Benjamin R. Teitelbaum, former professor of Nordic Studies (current professor of musicology) at University of Colorado, argues that several parts of the manifesto suggest that Breivik was concerned about race, not only about Western culture or Christianity, labelling him as a white nationalist.

Thomas Hegghammer of the Norwegian Defence Research Establishment described the ideologies of Breivik as "not fitting the established categories of right-wing ideology, like white supremacism, ultranationalism or Christian fundamentalism", but more akin to macro-nationalism and a "new doctrine of civilisational war". Norwegian social scientist Lars Gule characterised Breivik as a "national conservative, not a Nazi". Pepe Egger of the think-tank Exclusive Analysis says "the bizarre thing is that his ideas, as Islamophobic as they are, are almost mainstream in many European countries".

In one section of the manifesto titled "Battlefield Wikipedia", Breivik explains the importance of using Wikipedia as a venue for disseminating views and information to the general public, although the Norwegian professor Arnulf Hagen claims that this was a document that he had copied from another author and that Breivik was unlikely to be a contributor to Wikipedia. According to the leader of the Norwegian chapter of the Wikimedia Foundation an account has been identified which they believe Breivik used. On the second day of his trial, Breivik cited Wikipedia as the main source for his worldview.

Influence
Breivik's manifesto 2083: A European Declaration of Independence circulated in online fascist forums where strategies were set and tactics debated. In an essay called "Right-wing terrorism as folk activism," neoreactionary blogger Curtis Yarvin described Breivik's actions as "illegitimate, ineffective and wrong", while accusing left-wingers of hypocrisy in their response to the attack: "No one who condones Che, Stalin, Mao, or any other leftist murderer, has any right to ask anyone else to dissociate himself from a rightist who didn't even make triple digits." Australian terrorist Brenton Harrison Tarrant who killed 51 people (all Muslims) and injured 50 more during the Christchurch mosque shootings at Al Noor Mosque and Linwood Islamic Centre in Christchurch, New Zealand, mentioned Breivik in his manifesto The Great Replacement as one of the far-right mass murderers and killers he supports and said "But only really took true inspiration from Knight Justiciar Breivik" even going as far as to claim "brief contact" with him and his organization Knights' Templar.

Beliefs
Breivik had been active on several anti-Islamic and nationalist blogs, including document.no, and was a regular reader of Gates of Vienna, the Brussels Journal and Jihad Watch. Breivik frequently praised the writings of blogger Fjordman. He used Fjordman's thinking to justify his actions, citing him 111 times in the manifesto.

After studying several militant groups, including the IRA, ETA and others, Breivik suggests far-right militants should adopt al-Qaeda's methods, learn from their success, and avoid their mistakes. Breivik described al-Qaeda as the "most successful revolutionary force in the world" and praised their "cult of martyrdom".

In a letter Breivik sent to international media in January 2014, he stated that he exploited "counterjihadist" rhetoric as a means to protect "ethno-nationalists" and start a media hunt against "anti-nationalist counterjihadist"-supporters, in a strategy he calls "double psychology". Breivik further stated that he strives for a "pure Nordic ideal", advocating the establishment of a similar party in Norway to the (now-defunct) neo-Nazi Party of the Swedes, and identifying himself as a part of "Western Europe's fascist movement". Moreover, he stated that his "support" for Israel is limited for it to function as a place to deport "disloyal Jews". During the trial in 2012, Breivik listed as his influences a number of neo-Nazi activists, as well as perpetrators of attacks against immigrants and leftists, considering them "heroes". In 2019, he claimed to have converted to democratic right-wing populism. This has later been disputed since he still identifies as a "national socialist" and is possibly "more radical" than before with advocacy for white separatism.

Religious views
On 17 April 2012, when asked by Lawyer Siv Hallgren if he is religious, Breivik answered in the affirmative. Later, during the same conversation, he states "I am Christian. I believe in God, but I am a bit religious, but not especially religious."

Following his arrest (in 2011), Breivik was characterised by analysts as being a right-wing extremist with anti-Muslim views and a deep-seated hatred of Islam, who considered himself a knight dedicated to stemming the tide of Muslim immigration into Europe. At the same time, Breivik said both during his trial and in his manifesto to have been inspired by jihadist groups, and stated his willingness to work with groups like Al-Qaeda, Al-Shabaab, Iran and Sudan in order to conduct attacks with weapons of mass destruction against Western targets.

He was at first described by many in the media as a Christian fundamentalist, Christian terrorist, and nationalist. He stated that the European Union is a project to create "Eurabia" and describes the 1999 NATO bombing of Yugoslavia as being authorised by "criminal western European and American leaders". In his writings, Breivik stated that "the Battle of Vienna in 1683 should be celebrated as the Independence Day for all Western Europeans as it was the beginning of the end for the second Islamic wave of Jihads". The manifesto urges the Hindu nationalists to drive Muslims out of India. It demands the forced deportation of all Muslims from Europe, based on the model of the Beneš decrees.

His religious faith has later been described as being Odinism. While Breivik was frequently described as a "Christian fundamentalist", such assertion was disputed in a number of sources, and Breivik denied it, saying in letters to Norwegian newspaper Dagen that he "is not, and has never been a Christian", and that he thinks there are few things in the world more "pathetic" than "the Jesus-figure and his message". He said he prays and sacrifices to Odin, and identifies his religion as Odinism.

Links to organizations

Shooting club
Breivik was an active member of an Oslo shooting club between 2005 and 2007, and from 2010. According to the club, which banned him for life after the attacks, Breivik took part in 13 organized training sessions and one competition since June 2010. The club states that it does not evaluate the members' suitability regarding possession of weapons.

Freemasons
At the time of the attacks, Breivik was a member of the Lodge of St. Olaf at the Three Columns in Oslo and had displayed photographs of himself in partial Masonic regalia on his Facebook profile. In interviews after the attacks, his lodge said it had only minimal contact with him, and that when made aware of Breivik's membership, Grand Master of the Norwegian Order of Freemasons, Ivar A. Skaar, issued an edict immediately excluding him from the fraternity based upon the acts he carried out and the values that appear to have motivated them. According to the Lodge records, Breivik took part in a total of four meetings between his initiation in February 2007 and his exclusion from the order (one each to receive the first, second, and third degrees, and one other meeting) and held no offices or functions within the Lodge. Skaar said that although Breivik was a member of the Order, his actions showed that he was in no way a Mason.

Progress Party
Breivik became a member of the Progress Party (FrP) in 1999. He paid his membership dues for the last time in 2004, and was removed from the membership lists in 2006.

During his time in the Progress Party, he held two positions in the Progress Party's youth organisation FpU: he was the chair of the local Vest Oslo branch from January to October 2002, and a member of the board of the same branch from October 2002 until November 2004.

After the attack, the Progress Party immediately distanced itself from Breivik's actions and ideas. At a 2013 press conference, Ketil Solvik-Olsen said that Breivik "left us [the party] because we were too liberal".

English Defence League (EDL)
Breivik claimed he had contact with the far-right English Defence League (EDL), a movement in the United Kingdom that has been accused of Islamophobia. He allegedly had extensive links with senior EDL members and wrote that he attended an EDL demonstration in Bradford. On 26 July 2011, EDL leader Tommy Robinson denounced Breivik and his attacks and has denied any official links with him.

On 31 July 2011, Interpol asked Maltese police to investigate Paul Ray, a former EDL member who blogs under the name "Lionheart." Ray conceded that he may have been an inspiration for Breivik, but deplored his actions.

In an online discussion on the Norwegian website Document.no on 6 December 2009, Breivik proposed establishing a Norwegian version of the EDL. Breivik saw this as the only way to stop left-wing radical groups like Blitz and SOS Rasisme from "harassing" Norwegian cultural conservatives. Following the establishment of the European Defence League, the Norwegian Defence League (NDL) launched in 2010. Breivik indeed became a member of this organization under the pseudonym "Sigurd Jorsalfar". Former head of the NDL, Lena Andreassen, claimed that Breivik was ejected from the organization when she took over as leader in March 2011 because he was too extreme.

Knights Templar

In his manifesto and during interrogation, Breivik claimed membership in an "international Christian military order", which he called the new Pauperes commilitones Christi Templique Solomonici (PCCTS, Knights Templar). According to Breivik, the order was established as an "anti-Jihad crusader-organisation" that "fights" against "Islamic suppression" in London in April 2002 by nine men: two Englishmen, a Frenchman, a German, a Dutchman, a Greek, a Russian, a Norwegian (apparently Breivik), and a Serb (supposedly the initiator, not present, but represented by Breivik). The compendium gives a "2008 estimate" that there are between 15 and 80 "Justiciar Knights" in Western Europe, and an unknown number of civilian members, and Breivik expects the order to take political and military control of Western Europe.

Breivik gave his own code name in the organisation as Sigurd and that of his assigned "mentor" as Richard, after the twelfth-century crusaders and kings Sigurd Jorsalfar of Norway and Richard the Lionheart of England. He called himself a one-man cell of this organisation, and claimed that the group has several other cells in Western countries, including two more in Norway. On 2 August 2011, Breivik offered to provide information about these cells, but on unrealistic preconditions.

After an intense investigation assisted internationally by several security agencies, the Norwegian police did not find any evidence a PCCTS network existed, or that an alleged 2002 London meeting ever took place. The police concluded Breivik's claim was a figment of his imagination because of his schizophrenia diagnosis, and were confident that he had no accessories. Breivik continued to insist he belonged to an order and that his one-man cell was "activated" by another clandestine cell.

On 14 August 2012, several Norwegian politicians and media outlets received an email from someone claiming to be Breivik's "deputy", demanding that Breivik be released and making more threats against Norwegian society.

See also

 List of rampage killers (religious, political, or ethnic crimes)
 Counter-jihad
 Hate crime
 Spree killer

References

Further reading
Borchgrevink, Aage Storm ["A Norwegian tragedy. Anders Behring Breivik and the roads to Utøya"] En norsk tragedie: Anders Behring Breivik og veiene til Utøya (2012)
 Borchgrevink, Aage Storm; Puzey, Guy A Norwegian Tragedy: Anders Behring Breivik and the Massacre on Utøya. 2013.  (translated from the Norwegian)
["The Mother"] Moren (2013), by Marit Christensen. Christensen claimed that for the last year of Wenche Behring Breivik's life, she had been her confidant, and that the book is based on Christensen's interviews with her. Wenche Behring Breivik hired a lawyer to prevent Christensen from publishing the book. The book was criticized for character assassinations of still living people.
Frydnes, Jørgen Watne ["No man is an island"] Ingen mann er en øy (2021)
 Seierstad, Åsne One of Us: The Story of a Massacre in Norway – and Its Aftermath (2013)
 Seierstad, Åsne; Death, Sarah. One of us: the story of Anders Breivik and the massacre in Norway. New York: Farrar, Straus & Giroux, 2015.  (translated from the Norwegian)
 Turrettini, Unni; Puckett, Kathleen M. The Mystery of the Lone Wolf Killer: Anders Behring Breivik and the Threat of Terror in Plain Sight. New York: Pegasus Crime, 2015.

External links

 Manifesto of Anders Behring Breivik Original document and video by Breivik.
 Washington Times: The Oslo Terrorist in His Own Words – Summary of Breivik's political beliefs
 BBC: Norway attacks: The victims – The eight Oslo bomb victims and the 69 youth camp victims
 Daily Telegraph: Trial indictment
 Influencing from prison
 The government should accept the criticism of the verdict
 

1979 births
Living people
Criminals from Oslo

Adherents of Germanic neopaganism
Antisemitism in Norway
Bombers (people)
Converts to pagan religions from Protestantism
Counter-jihad
Far-right politics in Norway
Former Lutherans
Nordicism
Norwegian anti-communists
Norwegian computer programmers
Norwegian conspiracy theorists
Norwegian critics of Islam
Norwegian male criminals
Norwegian modern pagans
Norwegian farmers
Norwegian mass murderers
Norwegian murderers of children
Norwegian neo-Nazis
Norwegian people convicted of murder
People convicted of murder by Norway
People imprisoned on charges of terrorism
People with antisocial personality disorder
People with narcissistic personality disorder
Spree killers
20th-century Norwegian people
21st-century Norwegian criminals
21st-century Norwegian male writers
Norwegian Freemasons